Fredonia, Texas may refer to the following places:

Fredonia, Gregg County, Texas
Fredonia, Mason County, Texas

See also
 Republic of Fredonia, short-lived attempt in 1826-27 by Anglo-settlers in Texas to secede from Mexico